Kai Haaskivi (born 28 December 1955) is a retired Finnish soccer player. He starred in the North American Soccer League, playing outdoor as well as indoor soccer. He also played for the Finland national football team. He now coaches in the United States.

Playing career

Professional 

The 178 cm midfielder began his NASL career in the summer of 1978 with the Dallas Tornado. Haaskivi played in 1979–80 with the Houston Hurricane and 1981–82 with the Edmonton Drillers. He led the league in assists in 1981 with 21 and helped the Drillers win the 1980–81 NASL indoor championship and was named the MVP of the finals. He finished his NASL career with 112 points in 135 games.

Haaskivi began his MISL career in the league's inaugural season of 1978–79 with the Houston Summit. Playing the next season with the Summit as well, he was named an MISL all-star in both seasons. The team lost the championship to the New York Arrows in 1980.

Haaskivi went on to star with the Cleveland Force from 1982–88. While with the Force he led the league in assists in the 1986–87 season. He then played one season for the Baltimore Blast before returning to Cleveland as player-coach of the Cleveland Crunch in 1989. He retired as a player after the 1991–92 season when the MISL, by then named Major Soccer League, folded. The Crunch moved to the National Professional Soccer League. Haaskivi served as color analyst on the team's radio broadcasts.

Haaskivi finished his career in the top ten of several MISL career statistical categories, including fifth in points with 683, tied for ninth in goals with 297, second in assists with 386, and eights in games played with 425. He was an eight-time league all-star selection and was named MVP of the 1987 All-Star Game in Los Angeles.

International 

Haaskivi played 12 full internationals for Finland, notching three goals in the process. In a 1982 friendly in Helsinki against England, celebrating the Finnish F.A.'s 75th anniversary, he scored on a penalty kick as the Finnish team lost 1–4. He also scored against Italy's World Cup Legend, Dino Zoff, in Turin, Italy during a 1978 World Cup qualifier.

Coaching career 

During the mid-1990s he served as the first director for IMG's soccer academy in Bradenton. He was assistant coach of the U-17 U.S. National (boys) Teams. From 2001 to 2004 he was head coach and general manager of Pittsburgh Riverhounds, an A-League team. He also coached in Cleveland as the men's and women's head coach for the Myers University Mustangs, and NAIA school.
Served as the director of coaching for the Cleveland United and the Braden River soccer club in Florida. Currently works for the US Soccer Federation as a Youth National Team Scout.

Awards and honors
In September 2006, Kai was inducted to the Greater Cleveland Sports Hall of Fame and in March 2013, Haaskivi was one of six men named to the 2013 class of the Indoor Soccer Hall of Fame. The other inductees are Gordon Jago, Preki, Zoltán Tóth, Brian Quinn, and Mike Stankovic.

Personal 
Haaskivi is brother-in-law of former star Finnish ice hockey player Matti Hagman and uncle to Calgary Flames Left Wing Niklas Hagman. His father, Olavi Haaskivi, served as the Director of Coaching for the Finnish Football Association for 35 years. His son is the actor Olli Haaskivi. Daughter, Nina Haaskivi.

Notes and references

General

Citations

External links 
 Kai Haaskivi Profile at SoccerInCollege.com
 Kai Hasskivi at NASLjerseys.com

1955 births
Living people
Baltimore Blast (1980–1992) players
Cleveland Crunch (MSL) players
Cleveland Crunch (original MISL) players
Cleveland Force (original MISL) players
Dallas Tornado players
Edmonton Drillers (1979–1982) players
Expatriate soccer players in Canada
Expatriate soccer players in the United States
Finland international footballers
Finnish expatriate footballers
Finnish expatriate sportspeople in Canada
Finnish expatriate sportspeople in the United States
Finnish footballers
Association football midfielders
Houston Hurricane players
Houston Summit players
Major Indoor Soccer League (1978–1992) coaches
Major Indoor Soccer League (1978–1992) players
North American Soccer League (1968–1984) players
North American Soccer League (1968–1984) indoor players
Sportspeople from Lahti
Pittsburgh Riverhounds SC coaches
Finnish football managers